The River Irt is a river in the county of Cumbria in northern England. The name of the river is believed to derive either from the Old English gyr which means "mud", or from the Brittonic words *ar, "flowing", or *īr, "fresh, clean, pure", suffixed with -ed, a nominal suffix meaning "having the quality of...".

The river forms at the confluence of Lingmell Beck and Mosedale Beck on Wasdale Head, which is on the north-western side of Scafell Pike. On its short journey to the coast, the Irt is crossed by the Cumbria Coastal Way long-distance footpath, at Drigg Holme packhorse bridge. The Irt flows through the Drigg Dunes and Irt Estuary Nature Reserve before joining the River Esk and River Mite at Ravenglass. The river is tidal up until the railway bridge that carries the Cumbrian Coast Line just south of  railway station.

In the 19th century the River Irt was famous for the extremely rare black pearls that grew in its freshwater mussels. Poaching of the pearls was thought to have led to the mussels becoming extinct in the River Irt, however, a very small number have survived. The West Cumbria Rivers Trust carried out conservation work on the river between February 2015 and February 2018 to try and protect the habitat and prevent the complete eradication of the freshwater mussel from the river.

Settlements

Nether Wasdale
Santon Bridge
Holmrook
Drigg
Ravenglass

Tributaries

Greathall Beck
Cinderdale Beck
Black Beck
Kid Beck
River Bleng

References

External links

Irt, River
1Irt